Erma is an unincorporated community and census-designated place (CDP) located within Lower Township in Cape May County, New Jersey, United States. As of the 2020 United States census, the CDP's population was 2,031, a decline of 103 from the 2010 census count of 2,134.

Geography
According to the United States Census Bureau, the CDP had a total area of 3.360 square miles (8.702 km2), including 3.260 square miles (8.443 km2) of land and 0.100 square miles (0.258 km2) of water (2.97%).

Demographics

Census 2010

Census 2000
As of the 2000 United States census of 2000, there were 2,088 people, 751 households, and 561 families living in the CDP. The population density was 240.7/km2 (623.3/mi2). There were 846 housing units at an average density of 97.5/km2 (252.6/mi2). The racial makeup of the CDP was 97.22% White, 0.48% African American, 0.05% Native American, 1.05% Asian, 0.48% from other races, and 0.72% from two or more races. Hispanic or Latino of any race were 1.68% of the population.

There were 751 households, out of which 38.9% had children under the age of 18 living with them, 60.7% were married couples living together, 10.3% had a female householder with no husband present, and 25.2% were non-families. 20.8% of all households were made up of individuals, and 8.7% had someone living alone who was 65 years of age or older. The average household size was 2.77 and the average family size was 3.24.

In the CDP the population was spread out, with 28.4% under the age of 18, 7.3% from 18 to 24, 27.9% from 25 to 44, 24.1% from 45 to 64, and 12.3% who were 65 years of age or older. The median age was 38 years. For every 100 females, there were 97.5 males. For every 100 females age 18 and over, there were 89.6 males.

The median income for a household in the CDP was $64,261, and the median income for a family was $69,063. Males had a median income of $45,694 versus $21,923 for females. The per capita income for the CDP was $20,765. About 1.8% of families and 3.9% of the population were below the poverty line, including 4.9% of those under age 18 and 6.5% of those age 65 or over.

Transportation
The main transportation route for Erma is U.S. Route 9.

The Cape May Airport is located in Lower Township, and has an Erma postal address though it is not in the CDP.

Government and infrastructure
The Lower Township Police Department station has an Erma address but is outside of the CDP.

Education

As with other parts of Lower Township, it is served by Lower Township School District for primary grades and Lower Cape May Regional School District (LCMR) for secondary grades; the latter operates Teitelman Middle School and Lower Cape May Regional High School.

The LCMR district describes its facilities as being in Erma; the schools and district headquarters are not in the census-designated place. The Cape May County Herald, and the Press of Atlantic City describe the school complex as being in Erma.

The elementary schools are in as follows: David C. Douglass Memorial Elementary School (pre-Kindergarten and Kindergarten) is in Villas CDP. The other three elementary schools are in Cold Spring: Carl T. Mitnick (grades 1-2), Maud Abrams (grades 3-4), and Sandman Consolidated (grades 5-6).

Students are also eligible to attend Cape May County Technical High School in the Cape May Court House area, which serves students from the entire county in its comprehensive and vocational programs, which are offered without charge to students who are county residents. Special needs students may be referred to Cape May County Special Services School District in the Cape May Court House area.

Notable people

People who were born in, residents of, or otherwise closely associated with Erma include:
 Charles W. Sandman Jr. (1921-1985), represented  from 1967 to 1975.
 Matt Szczur (born 1989), professional baseball player.

References

Further reading
Maps:
 Map from the 2010 U.S. Census
 Map from the 2000 U.S. Census.
 Map of Cape May County from the 1990 U.S. Census. Whitesboro-Burleigh is on pages 25, 26, 29, and 30

External links
 The Cape May Gazette Newspaper serving Erma.
 Erma Tabernacle: A United Methodist Church serving Lower Township NJ.

Census-designated places in Cape May County, New Jersey
Lower Township, New Jersey